Little Boots is the second extended play (EP) by English singer Little Boots, released exclusively to the iTunes Store on 5 January 2009 by 679 Recordings and Atlantic Records.

Track listing

Notes
  signifies a co-producer.

References

2009 EPs
679 Artists EPs
Albums produced by Greg Kurstin
Atlantic Records EPs
iTunes-exclusive releases
Little Boots albums